Matthew James (born 1973) is an American TV and film actor. He appeared in Jay and Silent Bob Strike Back and also portrayed Merl in the TV show Angel. He played a minor, character role in the 5th episode of television show The Good Guys entitled "$3.52".

References

External links 
 

1973 births
American male film actors
American male television actors
Living people